AÏsha Al-Manoubya (ʿĀʾisha al-Mannūbiyya), also known by the honorific Al-Saida ('saint') or Lella ('the Lady') (1199–1267 CE), is one of the most famous women in Tunisia, and a prominent figure in Islam.

ʿĀʾisha was known for her Sufism and good deeds. She was the supporter and student of Sidi Bousaid al-Baji and Abul Hasan ash-Shadhili. Her presence as a woman on the high level of education and advocacy activity and charity event was very unusual in her time.

Life
Dates given for ʿĀʾisha's life vary slightly, but scholarly sources give 1199–1267 CE (595–665 AH).

According to her hagiography, ʿĀʾisha was born in the village of Manouba, near Tunis, and showed signs of her saintliness already in childhood, challenging social norms and effecting miraculous deeds (karamāt). In portraying ʿĀʾisha's socially transgressive behaviour, her saint's life 'aligns her with the Ṣūfī model of the “blamable ones” (ahl al-malāma), those who went about transgressing social norms on purpose'. According to one of the legends of her hagiography 'after her father had slaughtered a bull at her request, she cooked it, distributed its meat to villagers, and brought it back to life in order to reveal her sainthood. This event is regularly commemorated in song during rituals held at her shrines'.

ʿĀʾisha studied in Tunis with Shādhiliyya Ṣūfīs, moving back and forth between her rural home and urban Tunis. Prominent influences were the female mystic Rābiʿa al-ʿAdawiyya al-Qaysiyya (c. 95/714–185/801); Abū l-Ḥassan al-Shādhilī (c. 593–656/1196–1258), who founded the Shādhilī Ṣūfī order; the Baghdadi ʿAbd al-Qādir al-Jīlānī (470–561/1077 or 1078–1166, of Baghdad, namesake and patron of the Qādiriyya); and al-Junayd (d. 297/910), a Shāfiʿī scholar associated with Baghdad but of Persian origin.

ʿĀʾisha is one of the few women to have been the subject of a written saint's life (manāqib) in the Islamic world of her time, and 'represents a leading figure of women's sainthood in Islam'. Whereas it was customary for female saints in her region to be recluses, ʿĀʾisha mixed with male society, whether the poor; Sūfī scholars; or even the Ḥafṣīd sultan. She had two shrines dedicated to her, one in La Manouba  (destroyed in 2012) and the other in the Gorjani district of Tunis.

Her commemoration 

In popular memory, ʿĀʾisha represents a powerful and respected saint. One of the souks of the Medina of Tunis, "Souk Al-Saida Al-Manoubya", was named after her.

A few kilometres from the Medina, a gourbiville takes her name. Al-Manoubya used to retire to pray in that neighbourhood.

The inhabitants of Manouba built a second mausoleum to commemorate ʿĀʾisha under the name of "The Mausoleum of Al-Saida Al-Manoubya" in her birthplace area. That mausoleum is very famous and has a big value in the Tunisian national heritage and history. It was vandalised and burned after the Tunisian Revolution, on 16 October 2012.

Primary sources

 Manâqib al-Sayyida ‘Â’isha al-Mannûbiyya (Tunis 1344/1925)
 Nelly Amri, La sainte de Tunis: Présentation et traduction de l'hagiographie de ‘Â’isha al-Mannûbiyya (m. 665/1267) (Arles: Sindbad-Actes Sud, 2008)
 '‘Âisha al-Mannûbiyya (v. 1198–1267)', in Audrey Fella, Femmes en quête d'absolu: Anthologie de la mystique au féminin (Michel, 2016)

Secondary studies

Many books and studies have discussed ʿĀʾisha's history. So too have cinema and Sufi songs and performances. The main scholarly studies of ʿĀʾisha are:

 Amri, Nelly, 'Femmes, sainteté et discours hagiographique au Maghreb médiéval: Naissance à la sainteté, naissance à l'histoire; Le case d'une sainte de Tunis, ‘Â’isha al-Mannûbiyya (m. 665/1267)', in Histoire des femmes au Maghreb: Réponses à l'exclusion, ed. by Mohamed Monkachi (Morocco: Faculté des Lettres de Kénitra, 1999), 253–74. Amri, Nelly, Les Femmes soufies ou la passion de Dieu (St-Jean-de-Bray: Dangles, 1992)
 Abū ‘Abd al-Raḥmān al-Sulamī, Early Sufi Women: Dhikr an-Niswa al-Muta’abbidat as-Sufiyyat, trans. by Rkia Cornell (1999)
 Katia Boissevain, Sainte parmi les saints. Sayyida Mannūbiya ou les recompositions cultuelles dans la Tunisie contemporaine (2006)

References 

Tunisian women
13th-century people of Ifriqiya
12th-century people of Ifriqiya
People from Manouba Governorate
People from the Almohad Caliphate
1199 births
1267 deaths
Sufi saints
Female Sufi mystics